Ellenby is a surname. Notable people with the surname include:

John Ellenby (1941–2016), British businessman
Milton Ellenby, American bridge player